Gus Grimly is a fictional character in the FX television series Fargo. One of the main characters of the first season, he is portrayed by Colin Hanks. He appears as a guest in season 2, with Hanks briefly reprising his role in a cameo.

Character summary

Grimly is a protagonist of the first season and appears as a guest in the second season. In the first season, he is introduced as an officer, and is a supporting figure in the solving of the case involving Lorne Malvo (Billy Bob Thornton) and Lester Nygaard (Martin Freeman). By the end of the season, he is working as a mailman following the inquiry into shooting Molly during the white out gun fight between Lorne Malvo and Mr Numbers and Mr Wrench. It is not stated whether he was fired or resigned from the Duluth PD.

Character arc
After Chief Vern Thurman (Shawn Doyle) and Lester Nygaard's (Martin Freeman) wife is murdered, Gus Grimly pulls Lorne Malvo (Billy Bob Thornton) over for speeding. Malvo presents Grimly with two choices: press the issue (and face death), or allow Malvo to leave (and live). Malvo drives away as Grimly, confused, does not report the incident.

Molly tells Bill Oswalt about her visit to Lester, but he is only more upset that Molly is still harassing Lester. Meanwhile, Malvo informs Don Chumph, the fitness instructor for Stavros's wife, that he knows he is the blackmailer. Malvo takes over the blackmail scheme and torments Stavros by exploiting his extreme religious beliefs. He kills Stavros' dog, replaces his pain medication with Adderall, and sabotages the plumbing system, causing pig blood to flow out of the shower.

Gus finally tells his angry superior that he let Malvo off with a warning for speeding, and he is sent to Bemidji to inform their police department. He meets Molly for the first time and after seeing him with Greta, she invites them over to her father's restaurant where they share a friendly conversation.

Molly Solverson is visiting Gus Grimly in Duluth to discuss the recent murders when gunshots are reported. At the scene they find a car wreck that Numbers and Wrench staged to trap Malvo. Numbers and Wrench then attack with automatic weapons; Malvo escapes the ambush and captures and tortures Numbers to tell him who sent them. Numbers replies, "Fargo" before Malvo fatally slits his throat. Molly and Grimly get separated and Gus accidentally shoots her.

At the hospital, Grimly agonizes over accidentally shooting Molly and destroying her spleen, but the injury is not fatal. The unloaded gun Lester placed in Gordo's backpack is discovered at his school. The Nygaard home is searched by police and the incriminating evidence that Lester planted in Chazz's gun safe is found.

Meanwhile, Molly Solverson returns to work and unsuccessfully attempts to reopen the Lester Nygaard investigation. At the Duluth hospital, Lorne Malvo kills a police guard and gives Mr. Wrench the handcuff key to escape, telling him that he and Mr. Numbers came closer than anyone else ever had to besting Malvo. Malvo confesses that he killed Mr. Numbers and tells Wrench to come find him if he still wants revenge. In Fargo, FBI Agents Pepper and Budge, having been assigned to surveillance during Malvo's 22-homicide gun rampage and missed his having walked right by their car en route to entering the building, are demoted to file clerks.

A year passes, and Gus Grimly, now a mailman, is happily married to Molly Solverson as they eagerly await their first child's birth. In Las Vegas, Lester, who has married Linda, receives an award for Insurance Salesman of the Year. While at the hotel bar, Lester spots Malvo, who now sports grey hair and a goatee rather than brown hair and a full beard. While conversing with his companions, Malvo calls himself "Dr. Michaelson".

At home, Molly Solverson receives word that another of Lester's wives has been murdered. Molly goes to the crime scene where she meets Lester. Lester tries but fails to retrieve the tickets from the jacket. The police bring Lester back to the station, where he refuses to answer any questions. Lester is allowed to return home the next morning, but must be accompanied by FBI agents Pepper and Budge.

Malvo goes to a used car lot and chats up one of the salesmen (the same young husband that Lester failed to sell life insurance to a year earlier) about one car that resembles an undercover police car, convincing him to allow the two to go for a test drive. Malvo later sees Lester being taken home by the FBI agents, and follows in his own car. During his trip home, Lester is asked about and solves the riddle of the fox, the rabbit and the cabbage. Once they return Lester home, the two FBI agents remain outside. Apparently forced by Malvo, the salesman drives his car up to Lester's house, attracting the attention of the agents; Malvo takes advantage of their distraction to murder both of them. It is implied that Malvo then kills the salesman.

Malvo enters Lester's house, and each stalks but fails to kill the other. Malvo strikes Lester in the face with Lester's award, bloodying his face and mirroring the injury inflicted on Lester by Sam Hess a year earlier. Though Lester's gun jams, Malvo's foot is caught in a bear trap left by Lester, and he escapes severely injured. Malvo retreats to his cabin to treat his injury, not knowing that Grimly has already found it. Grimly tells Malvo that he has solved his riddle posed a year earlier, and kills Malvo. When the police arrive, they find Malvo's trove of audio tapes, including the one containing Lester's confession for the murder of his first wife. Two weeks later, Lester, now the subject of a manhunt after his murder of Pearl has been revealed, is shown on a snowmobile in Glacier National Park. Lester is recognized by law enforcement officers and tries to escape, only to crash his snowmobile. Desperate, he continues on foot, only to crash through thin ice, presumably meeting his end, and revealing that the scene shown at the beginning of the episode depicted Lester's fate.

At home, Molly receives the news of Lester. Gus tells her that he's receiving a citation for bravery, but he feels that she deserves it. Molly reassures her husband that this is his moment.

Reception
Hanks received positive reviews for his portrayal. IndieWire said of the first season finale: "And so in the end, it wasn’t intrepid detective Molly Solverson (Allison Tolman) who killed the menacing Lorne Malvo (Billy Bob Thornton), but her husband, Gus (Colin Hanks), a fearful ex-cop who seemed temperamentally better suited to his new job as a rural mailman. Molly didn’t even get to slap the cuffs on Lester Nygaard (Martin Freeman), whom she’d pursued for more than a year; like the movie’s Jerry Lundegaard, Lester fled town, only instead of being captured he fell through a hole in the thin Montana ice."

References

Television characters introduced in 2014
Fictional American police officers
Fargo (TV series) characters
Fictional sheriffs